Drissa Tou (born 1 January 1973) is a Burkinabé boxer who competed at the 2000 Summer Olympics.

Tou competed in the flyweight division, and after a walkover in the first round he lost to Frenchman Jérôme Thomas in the next round, who went on to win the bronze medal.

References

1973 births
Living people
Olympic boxers of Burkina Faso
Boxers at the 2000 Summer Olympics
Burkinabé male boxers
Flyweight boxers
21st-century Burkinabé people